The Good Life is a compilation album released by clothing company FUBU in conjunction with Universal Records. It was released on September 25, 2001 and consisted of a blend of hip hop and contemporary R&B. The Goodlife peaked at 52 on the Billboard 200 and 9 on the Top R&B/Hip-Hop Albums chart. FUBU Partner Carl Brown served as President of FUBU Records and Executive Producer of the album.

One charting single was released, "Fatty Girl" by Ludacris, LL Cool J and Keith Murray. It peaked at 87 on the Billboard Hot 100, 32 on the Hot R&B/Hip-Hop Songs and 6 on the Hot Rap Singles. The second single was "50 Niggaz Deep" by Drunken Master and Lola Damone.

The album was mentioned by FUBU CEO Daymond John on an episode of ABC's Shark Tank. John said he was in the hole for $6 million on the album but the hit single "Fatty Girl" ended up earning $100 million through clothing.

Track listing

References

Hip hop compilation albums
2001 compilation albums
Universal Records compilation albums
Albums produced by the Neptunes